Mzwanele Nyhontso is a South African politician who is the president of the Pan Africanist Congress of Azania. He is also a member of the National Assembly of South Africa.

PAC leadership and parliamentary career
In December 2018, Nyhontso was elected leader of the Pan Africanist Congress of Azania. His leadership has been marred by infighting between factions in the party and leadership challenges. His leadership is disputed by Narius Moloto, who was elected PAC leader at a different elective congress earlier in 2018.

In May 2019 Nyhontso was elected to the National Assembly as the PAC's only MP. In June 2019 he became a member of the Joint Standing Committee on Defence, the  Portfolio Committee on Higher Education, Science and Technology, the Portfolio Committee on Environment, Forestry and Fisheries, the  Portfolio Committee on Mineral Resources and Energy, and the Disciplinary Committee.

Nyhontso was re-elected as PAC leader in September 2019, while another faction re-elected Moloto as leader in August 2019. Nyhontso was officially recognised by the  Independent Electoral Commission (IEC) as the legitimate leader of the PAC, but it is still disputed by Moloto and his faction.

In November 2020, Nyhontso's parliamentary membership was suspended by speaker Thandi Modise  after the Supreme Court of Appeal ruled that the 2019 decision by the Moloto's faction to expel him could only be set aside by a court of law. Nyhontso then approached the Western Cape High Court and it ordered his reinstatement as a Member of Parliament in the interim on 3 December 2020, pending a decision of the Court regarding the challenge of his recent removal by his party. In February 2021, the High Court dismissed an application by Moloto's faction for leave to appeal an interim ruling that reinstated Nyhontso as the party's single representative in the National Assembly with costs. Nyhontso's application to reinstate him as a Member of Parliament was set aside in May 2021. He then sought to appeal the ruling.

On 23 June 2021, he lost his parliamentary membership again. Bennet Joko was sworn in to replace him. The North Gauteng High Court officially recognised Nyhontso as the legitimate leader of the PAC on 23 August 2021, however, the judgement was based on a technicality due to Moloto's notice of appeal of an earlier ruling not being received by the court's registrar. The court declared Moloto's election in August 2019 invalid. Nyhontso's confirmation as president allowed him to return his seat in the National Assembly and he was sworn in on 2 September 2021, replacing Joko.

References

Living people
Year of birth missing (living people)
Place of birth missing (living people)
Xhosa people
Members of the National Assembly of South Africa
Pan Africanist Congress of Azania politicians